The Waasland is a Belgian region. It is part of the Belgian provinces of East Flanders and Antwerp. The other borders of the Land van Waas are with the Scheldt and Durme rivers. The (informal) capital and major city of the region is Sint-Niklaas.

It is also called the Land van Waas (Land of Waas); Waas most likely refers to the soggy soil of the region although the exact etymology is unknown. One possibility is a connection to the English word "wasteland". The swamps that characterized it have long been drained although many fields are still noticeably convex; the result of many years of plowing the topsoil towards the center to improve drainage.

Historically, on account of its waterlogged, poor soils the region was thinly populated in comparison to the rest of Belgium and agriculture was by necessity based on holder farms using innovative techniques not usually applied elsewhere even if the farmers had ready markets nearby in the cities of Ghent and Antwerp. Charles Townshend (1674–1748), one of the proponents of the early agricultural revolution, was an explicit advocate of agricultural practices first developed here in Belgium, such as the use of turnips in crop rotation, and the region for some time attracted study trips by early agriculturists in his wake.

The epic tale of Reynard the Fox is set in the region.

The surname "Waas" and variants thereof is quite common in Belgium and refers to this region.

Communities in the Waasland
In the province of East-Flanders:

 Beveren
 Kruibeke
 Lokeren
 Moerbeke-Waas
 Sint-Gillis-Waas
 Sint-Niklaas
 Stekene
 Temse
 Waasmunster

In the province of Antwerp:

 Zwijndrecht

Gallery

 
Areas of Belgium
Regions of Flanders
Geography of Antwerp Province
Geography of East Flanders